Roy Dubard Bridges Jr. (born July 19, 1943) is an American pilot, engineer, retired United States Air Force officer, test pilot, former NASA astronaut and the former director of NASA's John F. Kennedy Space Center and Langley Research Center. As a command pilot, he has over 4,460 flying hours, and is a decorated veteran of 262 combat missions during the Vietnam War. He retired as a U.S. Air Force major general, last serving as the Director of Requirements, Headquarters Air Force Materiel Command, Wright-Patterson Air Force Base, Ohio, from June 1993 until his retirement. He is married with two adult children.

Early life and education
Born July 19, 1943, in Atlanta, Bridges grew up in Gainesville, Georgia, and graduated from Gainesville High School in 1961. He was active in the Boy Scouts of America, where he achieved its second-highest rank, Life Scout.  He is a distinguished graduate of the United States Air Force Academy, Colorado Springs, Colorado, earning a Bachelor of Science degree in engineering science in 1965. He received a Master of Science degree in Astronautics from Purdue University, West Lafayette, Indiana, in 1966.

NASA career
Bridges served as a NASA astronaut, piloting the Space Shuttle Challenger on mission STS-51-F (July 29 to August 6, 1985).

Bridges became the Director of NASA's Langley Research Center in 2003, after serving as Director of the John F. Kennedy Space Center (KSC). He retired from Langley and from NASA at the end of 2005. As the senior management official of the laboratory employing approximately 2,100 NASA civil service and 1,800 contractor personnel, Bridges was responsible for the center's aeronautical and space research programs, as well as facilities, personnel, and administration. In that capacity, he was responsible for managing facilities and activities related to the processing and launch of the Space Shuttle, processing and integration of Shuttle payloads and those aboard Expendable Launch Vehicles (ELVs), as well as final tests and preparation of elements delivered to the International Space Station via Shuttle.  He was also responsible for managing the acquisition and launch of all NASA ELV missions.

As Director of the Kennedy Space Center for over six years, Bridges was responsible for managing NASA's only site for processing and launch of the Space Shuttle vehicle; processing the payloads flown on both the Shuttle and expendable launch vehicles; and overseeing expendable vehicle launches carrying NASA payloads. He managed a team of about 2,000 NASA civil servants and about 14,000 contractors.

Military career
Bridges, a decorated veteran of 262 combat missions during Vietnam War, is a retired U.S. Air Force major general who served as the director of requirements, Headquarters Air Force Materiel Command, Wright-Patterson Air Force Base, Ohio, from June 1993 until his retirement July 1, 1996. In that position he served as the Command focal point for product management policy, processes and resources.

Prior to his assignment at Wright-Patterson Air Force Base, Bridges was the commander, Air Force Flight Test Center, Edwards Air Force Base, California. He has served in several key leadership positions including deputy chief of staff, test and resources, Headquarters Air Force Systems Command, Andrews Air Force Base, Maryland; commander, Eastern Space and Missile Center, Patrick Air Force Base, Florida; commander, 6510th Test Wing, Edwards Air Force Base, California.

In the course of his career he has completed the following assignments:

Assignments
 June 1965 to January 1966, student, Purdue University, Indiana 
 March 1966, student, pilot training, Williams Air Force Base, Arizona 
 March 1967, F-100 pilot, 524th Tactical Fighter Squadron, Cannon Air Force Base, New Mexico 
 December 1968, F-100 pilot, 416th Tactical Fighter Squadron and Commando Sabre Operation (Misty), Phu Cat Air Base, Republic of Vietnam
 January 1970, T-37 instructor pilot, 3575th Pilot Training Squadron, Vance Air Force Base, Oklahoma 
 July 1970, student, United States Air Force Aerospace Research Pilot School, Edwards Air Force Base, California
 July 1971, test pilot, Air Force Flight Test Center, Edwards AFB
 August 1975, distinguished graduate, Air Command and Staff College, Maxwell Air Force Base, Alabama
 June 1976, F-15 and A-10 program element monitor, Headquarters U.S. Air Force, Washington, D.C.
 July 1979, Special Assistant to the Deputy Chief of Staff, Research, Development, and Acquisition, Headquarters U.S. Air Force, Washington, D.C. 
 November 1979, assistant director of Plans, Detachment 3, Air Force Flight Test Center, Nellis Air Force Base, Nevada 
 July 1980, Astronaut, Johnson Space Center, Houston, Texas 
 May 1986, commander of 6510th Test Wing, Edwards AFB
 March 1989, commander of Eastern Space and Missile Center, Patrick Air Force Base, Florida 
 January 1990, deputy chief of staff, test and resources, Headquarters Air Force Systems Command, Andrews Air Force Base, Maryland 
 August 1991, commander of Air Force Flight Test Center, Edwards AFB
 June 1993, director of requirements, Headquarters Air Force Materiel Command, Wright-Patterson Air Force Base, Ohio
 July 1, 1996, retired.

Effective dates of promotion

Awards and decorations

He is the recipient of several awards and honors including recognition as a distinguished graduate of Air Force Pilot Training and a top graduate of the U.S. Air Force Test Pilot School, the Presidential Meritorious Executive Award, and a NASA Certificate of Commendation. He is a member of the Georgia Aviation Hall of Fame.

Personal life
Bridges is married to the former Benita Louise Allbaugh of Tucson, Arizona. They have two adult children.

Bridges is an executive with Northrop Grumman Technical Services.

References

External links

Spacefacts biography of Roy D. Bridges Jr.

1943 births
Living people
United States Air Force astronauts
Center Directors of NASA
Directors of the Kennedy Space Center
People from Atlanta
People from Gainesville, Georgia
United States Air Force Academy alumni
Purdue University School of Aeronautics and Astronautics alumni
U.S. Air Force Test Pilot School alumni
United States Air Force generals
American test pilots
Recipients of the Air Force Distinguished Service Medal
Recipients of the Legion of Merit
Recipients of the Distinguished Flying Cross (United States)
Recipients of the Air Medal
Recipients of the Defense Superior Service Medal
Space Shuttle program astronauts